Trauma is the second studio album by American rock band I Prevail, released on March 29, 2019. The album was the fourth best-selling album of the week in the US upon release, and its second single, "Breaking Down", hit the top 10 of the Billboard Mainstream Rock Songs chart in May 2019. Two Grammy nominations were received in relation to the album: Trauma received a nomination for Grammy Award for Best Rock Album, while the song "Bow Down" received a nomination for the Grammy Award for Best Metal Performance.

Background and themes
The album's creation was heavily affected by the band's earlier rise to fame, complications, and struggles with depression. The band received a quick rise to fame with the release of a Taylor Swift cover of the song "Blank Space", followed by their debut album, Lifelines. However, in 2017, frontman Brian Burkheiser had a polyp in his vocal cords, halting their 2017 tour and momentum; this caused Burkheiser to spiral into depression. Despite the band almost breaking up during this time, they instead found inspiration to make an album around the concepts they had been struggling with. The album's emphasis on mental health was also inspired by the death of Kyle Pavone of We Came as Romans, of which the band had toured with in 2017. Guitarist Dylan Bowman outlined the album in comparison to Lifelines: 

The band spent 10 months of 2018 recording the album.

Sound and composition
Band member Eric Vanlerberghe described the band's approach to the album:  He also said that the band was entirely in control of the album's sound and direction unlike their prior album, Lifelines, which the band felt received too much outside input on its direction. The band sought to create a more original sound after the common criticism that the band's talents were squandered under the "cookie-cutter", generic sound of Lifelines. Guitarist Dylan Bowman described the approach as pushing the limits of the band's sound in two directions, both as its most poppy, and its most heavy.

Release
On February 19, 2019, the band announced that their forthcoming album was called Trauma. Three songs and music videos were released in advance of the album: "Breaking Down" and "Bow Down" in February, and "Paranoid" in March. The album was released on March 29, 2019. It debuted at number four on the Billboard Top Album Sales chart. It placed at number 14 overall on the Billboard 200 chart, which factors in music streaming and album equivalent units. As of March 2020, the album has earned 181,000 album equivalent units.

A music video for "Hurricane" was released shortly after the album's release as well.

Reception

The album was generally well received. Wall of Sound praised the band's efforts to "push musical boundaries", praising the album for instill[ing] a newfound appreciation of how absolutely talented these guys are because the way every song manages to stand so well on their own has to be highly praised. I Prevail have definitely outdone themselves, redefining their sound. Loudwire named the album one of the best rock albums so far in a mid-year review of 2019.

Two Grammy nominations were received in relation to the album: Trauma received a nomination for Grammy Award for Best Rock Album, while the song "Bow Down" received a nomination for the Grammy Award for Best Metal Performance.

Track listing

Personnel 

I Prevail
 Brian Burkheiser – clean vocals
 Eric Vanlerberghe – unclean vocals
 Steve Menoian – lead guitar, bass
 Dylan Bowman – rhythm guitar, backing vocals 
 Gabe Helguera – drums

Guest
 Delaney Jane - vocals on "Every Time You Leave"
 Justin Stone - rap vocals on "Rise Above It"

Production
 Tyler Smyth – producer
 Mike Winkelmann - cover artwork

Charts

Weekly charts

Year-end charts

Awards and nominations
Grammy Awards

|-
| rowspan="2"| 2019 || "Bow Down" || Best Metal Performance || 
|-
| Trauma || Best Rock Album ||

References

2019 albums
I Prevail albums
Fearless Records albums